Arezzo War Cemetery is a war cemetery operated by the Commonwealth War Graves Commission, to the North West of the city of Arezzo, Italy. It was established in November 1944,  to house the remains of Allied casualties from World War II. The remains of 1,266 men are interred there, mostly British. However, the interments also include a number of members of the 4th and 8th Divisions of the Indian Army, who are buried in a separate section, in plots VII–IX. The cemetery also has one American burial, plus more from Canada, New Zealand, and South Africa, and 37 who are unidentified.

Near the entrance is an inscription, in English and Italian, reading:

Notable interments include Lieutenant St John Graham Young GC.

References

External links 
 

 The Canadian Virtual War Memorial article with plan of the cemetery

Commonwealth War Graves Commission cemeteries in Italy
1944 establishments in Italy
Arezzo